Bois Brule Creek is a tributary of Cinque Hommes Creek in Perry County, Missouri.

Name 
The name Bois Brule  (French: Bois Brûlé) means “Burnt Wood” was given to both the creek and the flood plain by early French settlers. The name was applied by the French to describe a burnt tract of forest found in the area.

Physical geography 
The stream's feature ID is 741394. A number of drainage ditches empty into Bois Brule Creek, draining excess water out of Bois Brule Bottoms.

Tributaries
Blue Spring Branch 
McClanahan Creek

Cultural geography 
Bridges that traverse Bois Brule Creek are the Bois Brule Creek CR 212 Bridge, the Bois Brule Creek CR 216 Bridge, the Route E Mystery Bridge, and the Route 51 Bois Brule Bridge at McBride, Missouri.

History 
The first European settlers in the vicinity of Bois Brule Creek were French colonial settlers. However, in 1798, a number of Irish Catholics were given permission to settle in the Bois Brule area. The Bois Brule Township was organized in 1821 and named after the creek and bottoms, and was one of Perry County's original three townships.

Communities 
 McBride

See also
List of rivers of Missouri

References 

Rivers of Missouri
Rivers of Perry County, Missouri